Blake Camp (born October 11, 1983) is an American soccer player.

Camp played some youth soccer in England and has trained with several prestigious professional clubs, including Manchester United and Blackburn Rovers in England, Real Valladolid in Spain, and Palmeiras in Brazil. After starring at Clarke Central High School in Georgia, where he was a four-time all-area performer, he played college soccer at Duke University. He became a regular starter and an all-ACC performer as a sophomore in 2003, then again in 2004 and 2005. In 2004, he was named to the NCAA Final Four All Tournament team. Camp was named to the Herman Trophy watch list in 2004 and 2005 and earned all-America honors as a junior and senior, finishing his collegiate career with 24 goals and the ACC Tournament MVP award as a senior.

Camp also spent two seasons in the USL Premier Development League, playing for Chicago Fire Premier in 2004 and for Raleigh CASL Elite in 2005.

He was drafted in the fourth round of the 2006 MLS SuperDraft, the 41st pick overall. The MetroStars traded goalkeeper Zach Wells to Houston to reacquire the 41st pick and select Camp. He suffered a broken ankle at the beginning of the 2007 season, and was waived by the team on November 28, 2007. Camp signed with USL 1st Division team, Atlanta Silverbacks in 2008.

References

1983 births
Living people
American soccer players
Duke Blue Devils men's soccer players
New York Red Bulls players
Chicago Fire U-23 players
North Carolina FC U23 players
USL First Division players
USL League Two players
Atlanta Silverbacks players
Soccer players from Georgia (U.S. state)
Major League Soccer players
New York Red Bulls draft picks
Association football midfielders